Lee Thornton Woodruff (April 14, 1910 – February 22, 1947) was an American football running back in the National Football League for the Providence Steam Roller, Boston Braves, and Philadelphia Eagles.  He was born in Batesville, Mississippi and played college football at the University of Mississippi.

External links
 
 

1910 births
1947 deaths
American football running backs
Providence Steam Roller players
Boston Braves (NFL) players
Philadelphia Eagles players
People from Batesville, Mississippi
Ole Miss Rebels football players
Players of American football from Mississippi